Taylor Outlier is a relatively isolated rock lying just in front of the west end of the Bermel Escarpment and about 1.5 nautical miles (2.8 km) east of the lower part of Counts Icefall, in the Thiel Mountains. Mapped by United States Geological Survey (USGS) from surveys and U.S. Navy air photos, 1959–61. Named by Advisory Committee on Antarctic Names (US-ACAN) for Alfred R. Taylor USGS geologist, a member of the United States Antarctic Research Program (USARP) Victoria Land Traverse, 1959–60.

Rock formations of Ellsworth Land